Steinsee is a lake at Stein Glacier near Susten Pass in the Canton of Berne, Switzerland.

See also
List of mountain lakes of Switzerland

External links

Lakes of Switzerland
Bernese Oberland
Lakes of the canton of Bern